Pierre Desir (born September 8, 1990) is a Haitian American football cornerback who is a free agent. He played college football at Lindenwood and Washburn, and was drafted by the Cleveland Browns in the fourth round of the 2014 NFL Draft. He has also played for the San Diego Chargers, Indianapolis Colts, New York Jets, Baltimore Ravens, and Tampa Bay Buccaneers.

Early years
Desir was born in Port-au-Prince, Haiti, to Wilfrid and Marie Desir. He immigrated along with his family to the United States at the age of 4, at first living in St. Louis, Missouri. The family moved to the suburb of St. Charles when Desir was 11 years old.

Desir attended Francis Howell Central High School in Cottleville, Missouri, where he was an all-state selection at defensive back. He was first-team all-league during his junior and senior seasons, and was named special teams player of the year as a senior. He averaged 37.8 yards per kickoff return and 8.9 yards per punt return. He was a record-breaking track runner while at the school as well.

Desir spent his summers as a youth in Lynn and Salem, Massachusetts, and Montreal.

College career
Desir attended Washburn University, and played for the Washburn Ichabods from 2008–2010. He sat out his freshman year as a redshirt. In 2009, he was named first team all-MIAA after leading the conference with seven interceptions and 13 passes defended, and finished the season with 33 total tackles. He also averaged 29.4 yards per kickoff return on 10 attempts. In 2010, he recorded 46 tackles, including 5.5 for loss, nine pass deflections, one forced fumble, and five interceptions, earning himself second team all-MIAA honors.

In 2011, he left Washburn, citing a desire to be closer to his young children, and enrolled at Lindenwood University. After not playing his first year, he returned in 2012 and was one of the top defensive players in the MIAA. To go along with 60 tackles, he finished second among all levels of NCAA football with nine interceptions and tied for the NCAA Division II lead with 18 passes defended. He was also named first-team All-MIAA and was a first-team AFCA Div. II All-American. In his final season, he once again was named a first-team All-MIAA selection and an AFCA Div. II All-American. He recorded 33 tackles, 12 pass deflections, and four interceptions. He also won the inaugural Cliff Harris Award, honoring the nation's top small college defensive player.

Desir finished his career ranked first in Mid-America Intercollegiate Athletics history in passes defended. His 25 career interceptions are the second most in conference history and rank him in the top 10 in Division II history.

Professional career
Desir was featured along with Jadeveon Clowney, Bishop Sankey, Blake Bortles, and Marqise Lee on ESPN's Draft Academy, which aired before the 2014 NFL Draft.

Cleveland Browns
The Cleveland Browns selected Desir in the fourth round with the 127th overall pick in the 2014 NFL Draft. He became the first player from Lindenwood to ever be selected in the NFL Draft and was the 15th cornerback drafted in 2014.

2014 season

On May 29, 2014, the Cleveland Browns signed Desir to a four-year, $2.62 million contract that includes a signing bonus of $407,612.

Throughout training camp, Desir competed to be a backup cornerback against Isaiah Trufant and Leon McFadden. Head coach Mike Pettine named Desir the fourth cornerback on the depth chart to begin the regular season, behind Joe Haden, Buster Skrine, and Justin Gilbert. Desir was inactive as a healthy scratch for the first 12 games of the regular season. On November 30, 2014, Desir made his professional regular season debut during a 26–10 loss at the Buffalo Bills in Week 13. On December 21, 2014, Desir earned his first career start and collected a season-high seven solo tackles and broke up two pass attempts during a 17–13 loss at the Carolina Panthers in Week 16. He finished his rookie season in 2014 with nine solo tackles and two pass deflections in five games and one start.

2015 season

During training camp, Desir competed for a roster spot as the third cornerback against Justin Gilbert, Charles Gaines, Robert Nelson, and K'Waun Williams. Head coach Mike Pettine named Desir the fourth cornerback on the Cleveland Browns’ depth chart to begin the regular season. He was listed on the depth chart behind Joe Haden, Tramon Williams, and K'Waun Williams. In Week 6, Desir collected a season-high 12 combined tackles (ten solo) and deflected one pass during a 26–23 loss against the Denver Broncos. He was inactive during the Browns’ Week 12 loss against the Baltimore Ravens and a Week 14 victory against the San Francisco 49ers. Desir finished the 2015 NFL season with 37 combined tackles (30 solo) and five pass deflections in 14 games and six starts.

2016 season
On January 4, 2016, the Cleveland Browns fired head coach Mike Pettine and general manager Ray Farmer after they finished with a 3–13 record. Throughout training camp, Desir competed for a roster spot as a backup cornerback against Justin Gilbert, Charles Gaines, Trey Williams, and Jamar Taylor. On September 3, 2016, the Cleveland Browns officially waived Desir as part of their final roster cuts.

San Diego Chargers

On September 4, 2016, the San Diego Chargers claimed Desir off of waivers. Head coach Mike McCoy named Desir the fifth cornerback on the Chargers’ depth chart to begin the regular season, behind Jason Verrett, Brandon Flowers, Casey Hayward, and Craig Mager. On October 22, 2016, the Chargers released Desir, but re-signed him two days later, only to be released again on October 29, 2016.

Seattle Seahawks
On November 2, 2016, the Seattle Seahawks signed Desir to their practice squad.

On January 16, 2017, the Seahawks signed Desir to a one-year, $790,000 reserve/future contract. Throughout training camp, Desir competed to be a backup cornerback against Mike Tyson, Tramaine Brock, Neiko Thorpe, Demetrius McCray, and DeAndre Elliott. On September 2, 2017, the Seattle Seahawks waived Desir as part of their final roster cuts.

Indianapolis Colts

2017 season

On September 3, 2017, the Indianapolis Colts claimed Desir off of waivers. Head coach Chuck Pagano named Desir the sixth cornerback on the Colts’ depth chart, behind Vontae Davis, Rashaan Melvin, Nate Hairston, Quincy Wilson, and Kenny Moore.

Desir earned a starting role in Week 8 after he surpassed Nate Hairston, Quincy Wilson, and Kenny Moore on the depth chart. He replaced Vontae Davis who was released on November 9, 2017, On November 12, 2017, Desir collected a season-high eight combined tackles, deflected two passes, and made his first career interception during a 20–17 loss against the Pittsburgh Steelers in Week 10. Desir intercepted a pass by Steelers’ quarterback Ben Roethlisberger, that was originally intended for wide receiver Martavis Bryant, during the first quarter. On December 3, 2017, Desir suffered a shoulder injury as the Colts lost 30–10 at the Jacksonville Jaguars. On December 4, 2017, the Colts placed Desir on injured reserve. He finished the season with 32 combined tackles (21 solo), seven pass deflections, and one interception in nine games and six starts.

2018 season

On March 20, 2018, the Colts signed Desir to a one-year, $1.75 million contract that included $750,000 guaranteed. Throughout training camp, Desir competed to be a starting cornerback against Nate Hairston, Quincy Wilson, and Kenny Moore. Head coach Frank Reich named Desir the third cornerback on the Colts’ depth chart to begin the regular season, behind Kenny Moore and Nate Hairston. On September 30, 2018, Desir made five solo tackles, broke up a pass attempt, and intercepted a pass during a 37–34 loss against the Houston Texans. In Week 6, he collected a season-high nine combined tackles during a 42–34 loss at the New York Jets. He finished the 2018 NFL season with 79 combined tackles (60 solo), eight pass deflections, and one interception in 16 games and 12 starts. Desir received an overall grade of 77.5 from Pro Football Focus, which ranked as the 18th best overall grade among all qualifying cornerbacks in 2018.

2019 season

On March 13, 2019, Desir signed a three-year, $22.5 million contract extension with the Colts with $12 million guaranteed.
In Week 7 against the Houston Texans, Desir recorded his first interception of the season off Deshaun Watson in the 30–23 win.
In Week 16 against the Carolina Panthers, Desir recorded two interceptions off passes thrown by rookie quarterback Will Grier during the 38–6 win.

On March 21, 2020, Desir was released by the Indianapolis Colts.

New York Jets

On April 2, 2020, the New York Jets signed Desir to a one year contract worth up to $5.5 million.

In Week 2 against the San Francisco 49ers, Desir recorded his first interception as a Jet off a pass thrown by Nick Mullens during the 31–13 loss. In Week 4 against the Denver Broncos on Thursday Night Football, Desir recorded two interceptions off of passes thrown by quarterback Brett Rypien, including a pick six, in the 37–28 loss. He also gave up a 48 yard touchdown reception to Broncos rookie wide receiver Jerry Jeudy during the game. On November 17, 2020, Desir was waived by the Jets. Despite being waived, Desir was named the Jets nominee for the Walter Payton Man of the Year Award.

Baltimore Ravens

On November 28, 2020, Desir was signed to the Baltimore Ravens' practice squad. He was elevated to the active roster on December 8, December 19, and December 26 for the team's weeks 13, 15, and 16 games against the Dallas Cowboys, Jacksonville Jaguars, and New York Giants, and reverted to the practice squad after each game. He was elevated again on January 15, 2021, for the team's divisional playoff game against the Buffalo Bills, and reverted to the practice squad again following the game. His practice squad contract with the team expired after the season on January 25, 2021.

Seattle Seahawks (second stint)
Desir signed with the Seattle Seahawks on April 23, 2021. He was released on August 24, 2021.

Tampa Bay Buccaneers

On September 13, 2021, Desir was signed by the Tampa Bay Buccaneers to the practice squad. He was promoted to the active roster on October 2, 2021. He played in twelve games with the team, both as a cornerback and on special teams.

NFL career statistics

Personal life
In 2011, Desir married Morgan Julian. They have three children: Keeli, Kamryn, and Pierre, Jr.

In February 2021, he donated 10,000 meals to the Houston Food Bank during Winter Storm Uri, which put much of Texas out of power, water, and heat.

References

External links

 New York Jets bio
 Lindenwood Lions bio
 Washburn Ichabods bio

1990 births
Living people
American football cornerbacks
American sportspeople of Haitian descent
Baltimore Ravens players
Cleveland Browns players
Haitian emigrants to the United States
Haitian players of American football
Indianapolis Colts players
Lindenwood Lions football players
New York Jets players
People from St. Charles, Missouri
Players of American football from Missouri
San Diego Chargers players
Seattle Seahawks players
Sportspeople from Greater St. Louis
Sportspeople from Port-au-Prince
Tampa Bay Buccaneers players
Washburn Ichabods football players